The 2020 storming of the Kurdistan Democratic Party Headquarters was a riot and violent attack against the Kurdistan Democratic Party on Saturday, October 17, 2020. The angry Popular Mobilization Forces supporters stormed the KDP offices in Karrada district in central Baghdad after the former Iraqi Foreign Minister Hoshyar Zebari said in an interview with Alhurra that "the Iraqi Government needs to clean up the Green Zone from the presence of the Popular Mobilization Forces" to protect the major road connected to Baghdad International Airport. The demonstrators set the KDP building on fire and burned Kurdish flags. The Iraqi prime minister Mustafa Al-Kadhimi decided to dismiss the manager of security forces in Baghdad general Jawad Al Daraji after Iraqi security abstained from preventing the protestors.

References 

2020 in Iraq
October 2020 events in Asia
History of Baghdad
Iraqi Kurdistan
2020 protests
Riots and civil disorder in Iraq
Burned buildings and structures in Iraq